Hopea samarensis is a species of plant in the family Dipterocarpaceae. It is endemic to the Philippines.

References

samarensis
Endemic flora of the Philippines
Trees of the Philippines
Taxonomy articles created by Polbot

Endangered flora of Asia